The Arthur Lewis Building, which is named after the economist Arthur Lewis, is part of the University of Manchester's campus.  It is located west of Oxford Road and south of the Manchester Business School, nearly a mile from the centre of Manchester, UK. Construction was completed in 2007, when the building was given a BREEAM 'Very Good' rating.

Controversies
In early 2008 the building was at the centre of controversy regarding access by students to members of the academic staff accommodated within due to its swipe card policy.  This system required taught students to either email their relevant tutor before meeting them, call them internally once at the building, or book an appointment online. In May 2008 the two schools in the building separately revised their access policies to ease access.

Floor-by-floor guide
The building is shared by the School of Social Sciences (SoSS) and the  School of Environment, Education and Development (SEED).

See also

University of Manchester
Professor Carol Smart, co-director of the Morgan Centre for the Study of Relationships and Personal Life
David Morgan (the sociologist that the Morgan Centre is named after)
Professor Rane Willerslev, former Associate Professor at the Granada Centre for Visual Anthropology

References

External links
University of Manchester, School of Social Sciences
University of Manchester, School of Environment, Education and Development
University of Manchester, School of Social Sciences, Granada Centre for Visual Anthropology
University of Manchester, School of Social Sciences, Morgan Centre for the Study of Relationships and Personal Life

Buildings at the University of Manchester
Buildings and structures completed in 2007